Alfred Schreiber (11 November 1923 – 26 November 1944) was a fighter pilot in the Luftwaffe during World War II. He is noted for claiming the first aerial victory by a jet fighter in aviation history.

Biography
Schreiber was born on 11 November 1923 in Neplachowitz. On 26 July 1944, Schreiber, a former Zerstörergeschwader 26 pilot, intercepted and attacked a Mosquito PR XVI, a photo-reconnaissance aircraft from No. 540 Squadron RAF, while flying Messerschmitt Me 262 A-1a W.Nr. 130 017. Upon returning to base, he claimed the first aerial victory by a jet fighter in aviation history. The front hatch had come off the Mosquito, hitting its wing and tail. It managed to return to an Allied held airfield in Italy where it was lost in the crash landing. Schreiber was credited with a further four aerial victories before being killed on 26 November 1944, making him the first jet ace in history. Schreiber was killed in a crash landing at Lechfeld. His aircraft wheels caught the lip of a slit trench, causing his Me 262 to cartwheel.

Claims
Schreiber submitted the following claims:

References

Notes

General references

 .
 .

1923 births
1944 deaths
Aviators killed in aviation accidents or incidents
German World War II flying aces
Luftwaffe pilots
Messerschmitt Me 262
People from Opava District